Henry Knight was a New Zealand professional rugby league footballer who played in the 1900s and 1910s. He played at representative level for New Zealand (Heritage № 37), and Wellington, as a forward (prior to the specialist positions of), during the era of contested scrums.

International honours
Henry Knight won caps for New Zealand in the 1909 New Zealand rugby league tour of Australia, playing as a forward, i.e. number 9, in the 5-10 defeat by Australia at Brisbane Exhibition Ground, Brisbane on Saturday 26 June 1909, and as a forward, i.e. number 8 in the 5-25 defeat by Australia at Royal Agricultural Society Showground, Sydney on Saturday 3 July 1909.

References

New Zealand national rugby league team players
New Zealand rugby league players
Place of birth missing
Place of death missing
Rugby league forwards
Wellington rugby league team players
Year of birth missing
Year of death missing